Lasiopetalum bracteatum, commonly known as Helena velvet bush, is a species of flowering plant in the family Malvaceae and is endemic to the south-west Western Australia. It is an erect, spreading shrub with egg-shaped leaves and loose groups pinkish flowers.

Description
The surfaces of the leaves are sparsely to densely covered with star-shaped hairs.

Taxonomy
This species was first formally described in 1839 by Stephan Endlicher who gave it the name Corethrostylis bracteata in Novarum Stirpium Decades. In 1863, George Bentham changed the name to Lasiopetalum bracteatum in Flora Australiensis. The specific epithet (bracteatum) means "bracteate".

Distribution and habitat
This lasiopetalum grows near creeks and drainage lines and near granite outcrops in the Jarrah Forest and Swan Coastal Plain biogeographic regions of south-western Western Australia.

Conservation status
Lasiopetalum bracteatum is listed as "Priority Four" by the Government of Western Australia Department of Biodiversity, Conservation and Attractions, meaning that is rare or near threatened.

References

bracteatum
Malvales of Australia
Flora of Western Australia
Plants described in 1839
Taxa named by Stephan Endlicher